Christa Zechmeister (born 4 December 1957 in Berchtesgaden) is a German former alpine skier and the youngest person ever to win a World Cup race, as well as the youngest to stand on the podium. A slalom specialist, she won seven World Cup races, taking the slalom title for the 1973-74 World Cup season.

World Cup career
Zechmeister made her World Cup debut in the 1972-73 season, scoring her first podium finish at Heavenly Valley, California on March 22, 1973 at the age of 15 years, 3 months, 18 days. The following season, she won the opening slalom race, held at Val d'Isere on December 8, 1973 — four days after her 16th birthday. Zechmeister was dominant that season, winning four slalom races en route to the discipline title.

Major championships
Zechmeister competed in two World Championships (1974 and 1978) and one Winter Olympic Games (1976). Her best result was a 7th-place finish in the slalom at Innsbruck in 1976.

External links
 sports-reference.com

1957 births
Living people
People from Berchtesgaden
Sportspeople from Upper Bavaria
Olympic alpine skiers of West Germany
Alpine skiers at the 1976 Winter Olympics
FIS Alpine Ski World Cup champions
German female alpine skiers
20th-century German women